Andrea Consigli (born 27 January 1987) is an Italian professional footballer who plays for Sassuolo as a goalkeeper.

Club career
Born in Cormano, Consigli is a youth product of Atalanta. To gain some first team experience, the young goalkeeper was loaned out to Serie C1 side Sambenedettese in the 2006–07 season. The following season, he was loaned to Serie B side Rimini. After a successful loan spell there, he returned to Atalanta and acquired the number 1 shirt.

On 1 September 2014, Consigli joined Serie A team Sassuolo for €3 million.

International career
Consigli made his debut with the Italy U21 squad on 15 August 2006, in a friendly match against Croatia. Then he was selected by head coach Pierluigi Casiraghi in the squad for the 2007 U-21 Championship as the third choice goalkeeper. After that competition he became the first choice in the goal for Italy U-21 team until the 2009 U-21 Championship, in which Italy reached the semi-finals.

In 2008, he took part at the 2008 Summer Olympics with the Italian Olympic team, as the back up of Emiliano Viviano.

He received his first call up for the Italian senior team by head coach Cesare Prandelli, for the friendly match against England held on 15 August 2012 in Bern.

Style of play
An experienced and reliable keeper, Consigli was considered to be a promising goalkeeper in his youth, and is known for his goalkeeping technique, quick reflexes, shot–stopping, and ability in one–on–one situations. He has also stood out for his penalty–stopping abilities throughout his career; with 19 stops in 364 appearances since 2009, he has parried the joint–third–most penalties in Serie A history, behind only Gianluca Pagliuca and Samir Handanović, with 24 stops each. His role model as a goalkeeper is Gianluigi Buffon. Considered to be one of the best goalkeepers in the Italian top–flight, and one of Sassuolo's best players, in 2012, Padraig Whelan of forzaitalianfootball.com described Consigli as "perhaps the most underrated player in Serie A in any position," and as a goalkeeper with "few weaknesses in his game."

Career statistics

Honours
Atalanta
Campionato Giovanissimi Nazionali: 2001–02
Serie B: 2001–02, 2010–11

Italy U21
UEFA European Under-21 Championship bronze: 2009

Individual
2009 UEFA European Under-21 Championship Selection

References

External links
U.S. Sassuolo Calcio Official Player Profile 

FIGC 

1987 births
Living people
Italian footballers
Atalanta B.C. players
Rimini F.C. 1912 players
Association football goalkeepers
A.S. Sambenedettese players
U.S. Sassuolo Calcio players
Serie A players
Serie B players
Serie C players
Footballers from Milan
Olympic footballers of Italy
Footballers at the 2008 Summer Olympics
Italy under-21 international footballers
Italy youth international footballers